Dillon W. Bassett (born April 2, 1997) is an American professional stock car racing driver. He competes part-time in the NASCAR Xfinity Series, driving the No. 77 Chevrolet Camaro for his team, Bassett Racing. He and his family team also previously competed full-time in what is now the ARCA Menards Series East. He is the brother of Ronnie Bassett Jr., who also drives for and co-owns Bassett Racing.

Racing career

He is the younger brother of fellow driver Ronnie Bassett Jr. The two drove for family-operated Bassett Racing in the K&N series, owned by their father Ronnie Sr. Moving up to the NASCAR Xfinity Series in 2019, Bassett made headlines when he ran into a sweeper truck at Iowa Speedway in July, relegating him to a 26th-place finish. In his next race at Richmond Raceway, Bassett came to finish 13th, a career-best in the Xfinity Series.

After the finish of the LS Tractor 200 at Phoenix Raceway, Bassett and Brandon Brown had a fight on pit road.

On February 2, 2021, it was announced that the Bassett brothers had split from DGM Racing and would be restarting their family team, Bassett Racing, which would field the No. 77 Chevrolet Camaro full-time in the Xfinity Series that year. Dillon and Ronnie Bassett will share the car with the likely possibility of additional drivers also making starts in select races. DGM crew chief Nathan Kennedy also moved over with the Bassett brothers to their new team. Dillon Bassett failed to qualify every race he attempted.

In 2022, Bassett and his team finally managed to qualify for a race at Nashville after suffering multiple DNQs. This wasn't the first time Bassett Racing finally managed to qualify for a race, as they qualified for the race at COTA last year with Austin Dillon.

Motorsports career results

NASCAR
(key) (Bold – Pole position awarded by qualifying time. Italics – Pole position earned by points standings or practice time. * – Most laps led.)

Xfinity Series

K&N Pro Series East

K&N Pro Series West

References

External links
 

Living people
1997 births
NASCAR drivers
Sportspeople from Winston-Salem, North Carolina
Racing drivers from North Carolina